Njie or N'jie (English spelling in Gambia), N'Diaye (French spelling in Senegal), N'diay (German) or Njaay (Serer spelling in Senegambia) is a Serer patronym. It is worn by both Serer and Wolof people. Notable persons with this surname include:

Njie
Abdou Njie (born 1992), Gambian footballer
Adama Njie (born 1978), Gambian runner
Al Njie (born 1955), American soccer player
Alhaji Njie ( Biri Biri; 1948–2020), Gambian footballer; father of Yusupha Njie
Alieu Badara Njie (1904–1982), Gambian civil servant, politician, and ambassador
Allen Njie (born 1999), Liberian footballer
Baboucarr Njie (born 1955), Gambian footballer
Bubacar Njie Kambi (born 1988), Gambian footballer
Bilal Njie (born 1988), Norwegian footballer; brother of Moussa Njie
Fallou Njie (born 1999), Gambian footballer
Fatou Mass Jobe-Njie (born ?), Gambian politician, ambassador, banker, and charity executive
Faye Njie (born 1993), Gambian-born Finnish judoka and Olympics competitor
Isatou Njie-Saidy (born 1952), Gambian politician and radio presenter
John Charles Njie (born ?), Gambian actor
Mambury Njie (born 1962), Gambian economist and politician
Marie Samuel Njie ( 20th century), Gambian griot singer, composer, and political figure
Momar Njie (born 1975), Gambian footballer and trainer
Momodou Baboucar Njie (1929–2009), Gambian politician and business executive
Moussa Njie (born 1995), Norwegian footballer; brother of Bilal Njie
Mustapha Njie (born 1996), Gambian footballer
Nancy Njie (born 1965), Gambian politician
Sainey Njie (born 2001), Gambian footballer
Sally Njie (born 1932), Gambian librarian
Seedy Njie (born 1994), British footballer
Sirra Wally Ndow-Njie (born ?), Gambian politician
Yusupha Njie (born 1994), Gambian footballer; son of Alhaji Njie

N'Jie
Momodou Bello N'Jie (born 1969), Gambian runner and Olympics competitor
Clinton N'Jie (born 1993), Cameroonian footballer
Louise N'Jie (1922–2014), Gambian teacher, feminist, and politician
Pierre Sarr N'Jie (1909–1993), Gambia lawyer and politician; first Gambian head of state after declared independence from Britain

See also
Ndiaye (disambiguation)
N'Diaye (disambiguation)

Notes

Serer surnames